Supreme Electoral Council may refer to:

 The Supreme Electoral Council of Nicaragua (CSE)
 The Supreme Electoral Council of Northern Cyprus (YSK)
 The Supreme Electoral Council of Turkey (YSK)